The Combat Aviation Brigade, 42nd Infantry Division is a subordinate command of the 42nd Infantry Division. Once contained solely within New York, force reductions and reorganizations have resulted in units from several different states making up the brigade.

Structure

Headquarters and Headquarters Company (HHC), Latham, NY
3rd Battalion, 142nd Aviation Regiment, Ronkonkoma, NY
Company A, Latham, NY
Company B, Ronkonkoma, NY
Company D, Latham, NY
Company E, Farmingdale, NY
Detachment 2, Company A, 1st Security & Support Battalion, 224th Aviation Regiment (S&S)
Detachment 3, Company E, 3rd Battalion, 142nd Aviation Regiment
642nd Aviation Support Battalion (642nd ASB), Rochester, NY
HHC, Rochester, NY
Detachment 2, HHC 3rd Battalion, 126th Aviation Regiment (3-126th Aviation Battalion) (TOC) at Rochester
Detachment 1, Company B, 3-126th Aviation Battalion (heavy lift) at Rochester
Detachment 2, Company D, 3-126th Aviation Battalion (maintenance) at  Rochester
Detachment 2, Company E, 3-126th Aviation Battalion (support) at Rochester
Company A, Dunkirk, NY
 Detachment 1 at Olean, NY
Company B, Ronkonkoma, NY
Company C, Brooklyn, NY
C Company 1st General Support Aviation Battalion, 171st Aviation Regiment (C-1-171st GSAB) at Rochester 
Detachment 2, Headquarters and Headquarters Company (2-HHC), 1-171st GSAB at Rochester
Company C, 1-171st GSAB at Rochester
Detachment 2, Company D, 1-171st GSAB at Rochester
Detachment 1, Company E, 1-171st GSAB

Activation and history

The New York National Guard played an active role in Army aviation from the early 1900s through the end of World War II.  The Combat Aviation Brigade, 42d Infantry Division traces its history from 1947 when the post-World War II reorganization of the United States military created the United States Air Force as an entity separate from the Army.  This reorganization also led to the creation of two divisions within the National Guard, the Army National Guard, and the Air National Guard.

In 1947 the New York Army National Guard fielded a fixed-wing aviation detachment of L-19 "Bird Dogs" assigned to Miller Field on Staten Island.  This detachment and aircraft from the II Corps and 101st Armored Cavalry Regiment were organized as the 42d Aviation Company at Huntington Station, Long Island in 1959.

In 1963, the 42d Division's aviation units were reorganized as the 42d Aviation Battalion, based at Freeport and Zahn's Airport, Long Island.  The battalion was equipped with O-1A Bird Dog and U-6 Beaver fixed-wing aircraft.

The 42d Aviation Battalion expanded as the United States Army began fielding helicopters, including the creation of "lettered" subordinate companies (Company A, 42d Aviation Battalion, and so on) and companies from other states.  In 1968 the battalion received OH-13s and OH-23s. In 1971, Company A (Niagara Falls) and Company B (Long Island NY) received Bell H-13, UH-1 and OH-6 helicopters. These companies consisted mainly of "lift" capacity and fielded the Delta and Hotel model UH-1, but each company had "Attack" platoons that flew "Charlie" and "Mike" model gunships.

By 1985 the 42d Aviation Battalion was fielding the AH-1 Cobras and OH-6 Cayuse, as well as the UH-1 Iroquois.

In October 1986 another reorganization resulted in the 42d Aviation Battalion being re-designated as the Aviation Brigade, 42d Infantry Division. This reorganization included the stand-up of 1st Battalion, 142d Aviation Regiment (Attack) headquartered in Latham (1989), and 2d Battalion, 142d Aviation Regiment (Assault) in Niagara Falls (1991).

In 1995 the Army’s "Aviation Restructuring Initiative" again reorganized the Aviation Brigade.  2-142d Aviation was inactivated, moved to Rochester as the redesignated as 1-142d, and received the AH-1 ‘F’ model helicopter.  1-142d in Latham was re-flagged as the 3d Battalion, 142d Aviation Regiment (Assault), and received the UH-60 ‘Blackhawk’ helicopter.

Operation Iraqi Freedom

The Aviation Brigade headquarters deployed to Iraq as part of the 42d Division (Task Force Liberty) in May, 2004 and returned in November, 2005.  Units subordinate to the Aviation Brigade in Iraq included:

Headquarters and Headquarters Company, Aviation Brigade, 42d Infantry Division
642d Aviation Support Battalion
1st Battalion, 150th Aviation Regiment (General Support), NJ ARNG
1st Battalion, 140th Aviation Regiment (General Support), CA ARNG
8th Battalion, 229th Aviation Regiment (Attack), USAR
1st Squadron, 17th Cavalry Regiment, 82nd Airborne Division.

Post Iraqi Freedom

The 2005 modular reorganization of Army combat divisions included the redesignation from "Aviation Brigade" to "Combat Aviation Brigade" (CAB). In 2006, the headquarters of the Combat Aviation Brigade, 42d Infantry Division was relocated to Latham, New York.

As part of planned force reductions following military operations in Iraq and Afghanistan, the 42nd Infantry Division has reconfigured and redistributed subordinate units.  As of 2013, the Combat Aviation Brigade has units in eleven states. Units based in New York include: Dunkirk; Jamestown; Olean; Rochester; Latham; Brooklyn; Patchogue; and Ronkonkoma.

New York Army National Guard Aviation units and individual volunteers have also continued to serve overseas in Iraq, Afghanistan, and elsewhere.  In 2013, the Combat Aviation Brigade was deployed in support of Operation Enduring Freedom.

Note: While commonly referred to as the 42nd Combat Aviation Brigade, the U.S. Army Center of Military History confirms that its correct designation is Combat Aviation Brigade, 42nd Infantry Division.

References

Military units and formations in New York (state)
Military units and formations established in 1947
Aviation Brigades of the United States Army
Combat 042